

Events

Pre-1600
 379 – Emperor Gratian elevates Flavius Theodosius at Sirmium to Augustus, and gives him authority over all the eastern provinces of the Roman Empire.
 649 – Conquest of Kucha: The forces of Kucha surrender after a forty-day siege led by Tang dynasty general Ashina She'er, establishing Tang control over the northern Tarim Basin in Xinjiang.
1419 – Hundred Years' War: Rouen surrenders to Henry V of England, completing his reconquest of Normandy.
1511 – The Italian Duchy of Mirandola surrenders to the Pope.
1520 – Sten Sture the Younger, the Regent of Sweden, is mortally wounded at the Battle of Bogesund and dies on February 3.

1601–1900
1607 – San Agustin Church in Manila is officially completed; it is the oldest church still standing in the Philippines.
1639 – Hämeenlinna is granted privileges after it separated from the Vanaja parish as its own city in Tavastia.
1764 – John Wilkes is expelled from the British House of Commons for seditious libel.
1764 – Bolle Willum Luxdorph records in his diary that a mail bomb, possibly the world's first, has severely injured the Danish Colonel Poulsen, residing at Børglum Abbey. 
1788 – The second group of ships of the First Fleet arrive at Botany Bay.
1795 – The Batavian Republic is proclaimed in the Netherlands, replacing the Dutch Republic.
1817 – An army of 5,423 soldiers, led by General José de San Martín, crosses the Andes from Argentina to liberate Chile and then Peru.
1829 – Johann Wolfgang von Goethe's Faust: The First Part of the Tragedy receives its premiere performance.
1839 – The British East India Company captures Aden.
1853 – Giuseppe Verdi's opera Il trovatore receives its premiere performance in Rome.
1861 – American Civil War: Georgia joins South Carolina, Florida, Mississippi, and Alabama in declaring secession from the United States.
1862 – American Civil War: Battle of Mill Springs: The Confederacy suffers its first significant defeat in the conflict.
1871 – Franco-Prussian War: In the Siege of Paris, Prussia wins the Battle of St. Quentin. Meanwhile, the French attempt to break the siege in the Battle of Buzenval will end unsuccessfully the following day.
1883 – The first electric lighting system employing overhead wires, built by Thomas Edison, begins service at Roselle, New Jersey.
1899 – Anglo-Egyptian Sudan is formed.

1901–present
1901 – Queen Victoria, Queen of the United Kingdom, stricken with paralysis. She dies three days later at the age of 81. 
1915 – Georges Claude patents the neon discharge tube for use in advertising.
  1915   – German strategic bombing during World War I: German zeppelins bomb the towns of Great Yarmouth and King's Lynn in the United Kingdom killing at least 20 people, in the first major aerial bombardment of a civilian target.
1917 – Silvertown explosion: A blast at a munitions factory in London kills 73 and injures over 400. The resulting fire causes over £2,000,000 worth of damage.
1920 – The United States Senate votes against joining the League of Nations.
  1920   – The American Civil Liberties Union (ACLU) is founded.
1937 – Howard Hughes sets a new air record by flying from Los Angeles to New York City in seven hours, 28 minutes, 25 seconds.
1942 – World War II: The Japanese conquest of Burma begins.
1945 – World War II: Soviet forces liberate the Łódź Ghetto. Of more than 200,000 inhabitants in 1940, fewer than 900 had survived the Nazi occupation.
1946 – General Douglas MacArthur establishes the International Military Tribunal for the Far East in Tokyo to try Japanese war criminals.
1953 – Almost 72 percent of all television sets in the United States are tuned into I Love Lucy to watch Lucy give birth.
1960 – Japan and the United States sign the US–Japan Mutual Security Treaty
  1960   – Scandinavian Airlines System Flight 871 crashes near Ankara Esenboğa Airport in Turkey, killing all 42 aboard.
1969 – Student Jan Palach dies after setting himself on fire three days earlier in Prague's Wenceslas Square to protest about the invasion of Czechoslovakia by the Soviet Union in 1968. His funeral turns into another major protest.
1977 – President Gerald Ford pardons Iva Toguri D'Aquino (a.k.a. "Tokyo Rose").
1978 – The last Volkswagen Beetle made in Germany leaves VW's plant in Emden. Beetle production in Latin America continues until 2003.
1981 – Iran hostage crisis: United States and Iranian officials sign an agreement to release 52 American hostages after 14 months of captivity.
1983 – Nazi war criminal Klaus Barbie is arrested in Bolivia.
  1983   – The Apple Lisa, the first commercial personal computer from Apple Computer to have a graphical user interface and a computer mouse, is announced.
1986 – The first IBM PC computer virus is released into the wild. A boot sector virus dubbed (c)Brain, it was created by the Farooq Alvi Brothers in Lahore, Pakistan, reportedly to deter unauthorized copying of the software they had written.
1990 – Exodus of Kashmiri Pandits from the Kashmir valley in Indian-administered Kashmir due to an insurgency.
1991 – Gulf War: Iraq fires a second Scud missile into Israel, causing 15 injuries.
1993 – Czech Republic and Slovakia join the United Nations.
1995 – After being struck by lightning the crew of Bristow Helicopters Flight 56C are forced to ditch. All 18 aboard are later rescued.
1996 – The barge North Cape oil spill occurs as an engine fire forces the tugboat Scandia ashore on Moonstone Beach in South Kingstown, Rhode Island.
1997 – Yasser Arafat returns to Hebron after more than 30 years and joins celebrations over the handover of the last Israeli-controlled West Bank city.
1999 – British Aerospace agrees to acquire the defence subsidiary of the General Electric Company plc, forming BAE Systems in November 1999.
2007 – Turkish-Armenian journalist Hrant Dink is assassinated in front of his newspaper's Istanbul office by 17-year-old Turkish ultra-nationalist Ogün Samast.
  2007   – Four-man Team N2i, using only skis and kites, completes a  trek to reach the Antarctic pole of inaccessibility for the first time since 1965 and for the first time ever without mechanical assistance.
2012 – The Hong Kong-based file-sharing website Megaupload is shut down by the FBI.
2014 – A bomb attack on an army convoy in the city of Bannu kills at least 26 Pakistani soldiers and injures 38 others.

Births

Pre-1600
 399 – Pulcheria, Byzantine empress and saint (d. 453)
1200 – Dōgen Zenji, founder of Sōtō Zen (d. 1253)
1544 – Francis II of France (d. 1560)

1601–1900
1617 – Lucas Faydherbe, Flemish sculptor and architect (d. 1697)
1628 – Charles Stanley, 8th Earl of Derby, English noble (d. 1672)
1676 – John Weldon, English organist and composer (d. 1736)
1721 – Jean-Philippe Baratier, German scholar and author (d. 1740)
1736 – James Watt, Scottish-English chemist and engineer (d. 1819)
1737 – Giuseppe Millico, Italian soprano, composer, and educator (d. 1802)
1739 – Joseph Bonomi the Elder, Italian architect, designed Longford Hall and Barrells Hall (d. 1808)
1752 – James Morris III, American captain (d. 1820)
1757 – Countess Augusta Reuss of Ebersdorf (d. 1831)
1788 – Pavel Kiselyov, Russian general and politician (d. 1874)
1790 – Per Daniel Amadeus Atterbom, Swedish poet and academic (d. 1855)
1798 – Auguste Comte, French economist, sociologist, and philosopher (d. 1857)
1803 – Sarah Helen Whitman, American poet, essayist, and romantic interest of Edgar Allan Poe (d. 1878)
1807 – Robert E. Lee, American general and academic (d. 1870)
1808 – Lysander Spooner, American philosopher and author (d. 1887)
1809 – Edgar Allan Poe, American short story writer, poet, and critic (d. 1849)
1810 – Talhaiarn, Welsh poet and architect (d. 1869)
1813 – Henry Bessemer, English engineer and businessman (d. 1898)
1832 – Ferdinand Laub, Czech violinist and composer (d. 1875)
1833 – Alfred Clebsch, German mathematician and academic (d. 1872)
1839 – Paul Cézanne, French painter (d. 1906)
1848 – Arturo Graf, Italian poet, of German ancestry (d. 1913).
  1848   – John Fitzwilliam Stairs, Canadian businessman and politician (d. 1904)
  1848   – Matthew Webb, English swimmer and diver (d. 1883)
1851 – Jacobus Kapteyn, Dutch astronomer and academic (d. 1922)
1852 – Thomas Price, Welsh-Australian politician, 24th Premier of South Australia (d. 1909)
1863 – Werner Sombart, German economist and sociologist (d. 1941)
1866 – Harry Davenport, American stage and film actor (d. 1949)
1871 – Dame Gruev, Bulgarian educator and activist, co-founded the Internal Macedonian Revolutionary Organization (d. 1906)
1874 – Hitachiyama Taniemon, Japanese sumo wrestler, the 19th Yokozuna (d. 1922)
1876 – Wakashima Gonshirō, Japanese sumo wrestler, the 21st Yokozuna (d. 1943)
  1876   – Dragotin Kette, Slovenian poet and author (d. 1899)
1878 – Herbert Chapman, English footballer and manager (d. 1934)
1879 – Boris Savinkov, Russian soldier and author (d. 1925)
1882 – John Cain Sr., Australian politician, 34th Premier of Victoria (d. 1957)
1883 – Hermann Abendroth, German conductor (d. 1956)
1887 – Alexander Woollcott, American actor, playwright, and critic (d. 1943)
1889 – Sophie Taeuber-Arp, Swiss painter and sculptor (d. 1943)
1892 – Ólafur Thors, Icelandic lawyer and politician, Prime Minister of Iceland (d. 1964)
1893 – Magda Tagliaferro, Brazilian pianist and educator (d. 1986)

1901–present
1903 – Boris Blacher, German composer and playwright (d. 1975)
1905 – Stanley Hawes, English-Australian director and producer (d. 1991)
1907 – Briggs Cunningham, American race car driver, sailor, and businessman (d. 2003)
1908 – Ish Kabibble, American comedian and cornet player (d. 1994)
  1908   – Aleksandr Gennadievich Kurosh, Russian mathematician and theorist (d. 1971)
1911 – Choor Singh, Indian-Singaporean lawyer and judge (d. 2009)
1912 – Leonid Kantorovich, Russian mathematician and economist, Nobel Prize laureate (d. 1986)
1913 – Rex Ingamells, Australian author and poet (d. 1955)
  1913   – Rudolf Wanderone, American professional pocket billiards player (d. 1996)
1918 – John H. Johnson, American publisher, founded the Johnson Publishing Company (d. 2005)
1920 – Bernard Dunstan, English painter and educator (d. 2017)
  1920   – Javier Pérez de Cuéllar, Peruvian politician and diplomat, 135th Prime Minister of Peru (d. 2020)
1921 – Patricia Highsmith, American novelist and short story writer (d. 1995)
1922 – Guy Madison, American actor (d. 1996)
  1922   – Arthur Morris, Australian cricketer and journalist (d. 2015)
  1922   – Miguel Muñoz, Spanish footballer and manager (d. 1990)
1923 – Jean Stapleton, American actress and singer (d. 2013)
1924 – Nicholas Colasanto, American actor and director (d. 1985)
  1924   – Jean-François Revel, French philosopher (d. 2006)
1925 – Nina Bawden, English author (d. 2012)
1926 – Hans Massaquoi, German-American journalist and author (d. 2013)
  1926   – Fritz Weaver, American actor (d. 2016)
1930 – Tippi Hedren, American model, actress, and animal rights-welfare activist
  1930   – John Waite, South African cricketer (d. 2011)
1931 – Robert MacNeil, Canadian-American journalist and author
1932 – Russ Hamilton, English singer-songwriter (d. 2008)
  1932   – Richard Lester, American-English director, producer, and screenwriter
  1932   – Harry Lonsdale, American chemist, businessman, and politician (d. 2014)
1933 – George Coyne, American priest, astronomer, and theologian (d. 2020)
1935 – Johnny O'Keefe, Australian singer-songwriter (d. 1978)
1936 – Ziaur Rahman, Bangladeshi general and politician, seventh President of Bangladesh (d. 1981)
  1936   – Willie "Big Eyes" Smith, American singer, harmonica player, and drummer (d. 2011)
  1936   – Fred J. Lincoln, American actor, director, producer, and screenwriter (d. 2013)
1937 – John Lions, Australian computer scientist and academic (d. 1998)
1939 – Phil Everly, American singer-songwriter and guitarist (d. 2014)
1940 – Paolo Borsellino, Italian lawyer and judge (d. 1992)
1941 – Colin Gunton, English theologian and academic (d. 2003)
  1941   – Pat Patterson, Canadian wrestler, trainer, and referee (d. 2020)
1942 – Michael Crawford, English actor and singer
1943 – Larry Clark, American director, producer, and screenwriter
  1943   – Janis Joplin, American singer-songwriter (d. 1970)
  1943   – Princess Margriet of the Netherlands
1944 – Shelley Fabares, American actress and singer
  1944   – Thom Mayne, American architect and academic, designed the San Francisco Federal Building and Phare Tower
  1944   – Dan Reeves, American football player and coach (d. 2022)
1945 – Trevor Williams, English singer-songwriter and bass player 
1946 – Julian Barnes, English novelist, short story writer, essayist, and critic
  1946   – Dolly Parton, American singer-songwriter and actress
1947 – Frank Aarebrot, Norwegian political scientist and academic (d. 2017)
  1947   – Paula Deen, American chef and author
  1947   – Rod Evans, English singer-songwriter
1948 – Nancy Lynch, American computer scientist and academic
  1948   – Frank McKenna, Canadian politician and diplomat, 27th Premier of New Brunswick
  1948   – Mal Reilly, English rugby league player and coach
1949 – Arend Langenberg, Dutch voice actor and radio host (d. 2012)
  1949   – Robert Palmer, English singer-songwriter and guitarist (d. 2003)
1950 – Sébastien Dhavernas, Canadian actor
1951 – Martha Davis, American singer
1952 – Dewey Bunnell, British-American singer-songwriter and guitarist
  1952   – Nadiuska, German television actress
  1952   – Bruce Jay Nelson, American computer scientist (d. 1999)
1953 – Desi Arnaz, Jr., American actor and singer
  1953   – Richard Legendre, Canadian tennis player and politician
  1953   – Wayne Schimmelbusch, Australian footballer and coach
1954 – Katey Sagal, American actress and singer 
  1954   – Cindy Sherman, American photographer and director
  1954   – Esther Shkalim, Israeli poet and Mizrahi feminist
1955 – Sir Simon Rattle, English orchestral conductor
1956 – Carman, American singer-songwriter, actor, and television host (d. 2021)
  1956   – Susan Solomon, American atmospheric chemist
1957 – Ottis Anderson, American football player and sportscaster
  1957   – Roger Ashton-Griffiths, English actor, screenwriter and film director
  1957   – Kenneth McClintock, Puerto Rican public servant and politician, 22nd Secretary of State of Puerto Rico
1958 – Thomas Kinkade, American painter (d. 2012)
1959 – Danese Cooper, American computer scientist and programmer
  1959   – Jeff Pilson, American bass player, songwriter, and actor
1961 – Paul McCrane, American actor, director, and singer 
  1961   – Wayne Hemingway, English fashion designer, co-founded Red or Dead
  1961   – William Ragsdale, American actor
1962 – Hans Daams, Dutch cyclist
  1962   – Chris Sabo, American baseball player and coach
  1962   – Jeff Van Gundy, American basketball player and coach
1963 – Michael Adams, American basketball player and coach
  1963   – Martin Bashir, English journalist
  1963   – John Bercow, English politician, Speaker of the House of Commons
1964 – Janine Antoni, Bahamian sculptor and photographer
  1964   – Ricardo Arjona, Guatemalan singer-songwriter and basketball player
1966 – Sylvain Côté, Canadian ice hockey player
  1966   – Stefan Edberg, Swedish tennis player and coach
  1966   – Lena Philipsson, Swedish singer-songwriter
1968 – David Bartlett, Australian politician, 43rd Premier of Tasmania
  1968   – Whitfield Crane, American singer-songwriter
1969 – Edwidge Danticat, Haitian-American novelist and short story writer
  1969   – Luc Longley, Australian basketball player and coach
  1969   – Predrag Mijatović, Montenegrin footballer and manager
  1969   – Junior Seau, American football player (d. 2012)
  1969   – Steve Staunton, Irish footballer and manager
1970 – Steffen Freund, German footballer and manager
  1970   – Kathleen Smet, Belgian triathlete
  1970   – Udo Suzuki, Japanese comedian and singer
1971 – Phil Nevin, American baseball player
  1971   – Shawn Wayans, American actor, producer, and screenwriter 
  1971   – John Wozniak, American singer-songwriter and guitarist
1972 – Ron Killings, American wrestler and rapper
  1972   – Troy Wilson, Australian footballer and race car driver
  1972   – Sergei Zjukin, Estonian chess player and coach
  1972   – Yoon Hae-young, South Korean actress
1973 – Antero Manninen, Finnish cellist 
  1973   – Yevgeny Sadovyi, Russian swimmer and coach
1974 – Dainius Adomaitis, Lithuanian basketball player and coach
  1974   – Frank Caliendo, American comedian, actor, and screenwriter
  1974   – Ian Laperrière, Canadian ice hockey player and coach
  1974   – Jaime Moreno, Bolivian footballer and manager
1975 – Natalie Cook, Australian volleyball player
  1975   – Zdeňka Málková, Czech tennis player
1976 – Natale Gonnella, Italian footballer
  1976   – Tarso Marques, Brazilian race car driver
  1976   – Drew Powell, American actor
  1976   – Marsha Thomason, British actress
1977 – Benjamin Ayres, Canadian actor, director, and photographer
1979 – Svetlana Khorkina, Russian gymnast and sportscaster
  1979   – Josu Sarriegi, Spanish footballer
  1979   – Wiley, English rapper and producer
1980 – Jenson Button, English race car driver
  1980   – Pasha Kovalev, Russian-American dancer and choreographer
  1980   – Luke Macfarlane, Canadian-American actor and singer
  1980   – Arvydas Macijauskas, Lithuanian basketball player
  1980   – Michael Vandort, Sri Lankan cricketer
1981 – Paolo Bugia, Filipino basketball player
  1981   – Asier del Horno, Spanish footballer
  1981   – Lucho González, Argentinian footballer
  1981   – Elizabeth Tulloch, American actress 
1982 – Pete Buttigieg, American politician
  1982   – Mike Komisarek, American ice hockey player
  1982   – Jodie Sweetin, American actress and singer 
  1982   – Shane Tronc, Australian rugby league player
  1982   – Kim Yoo-suk, South Korean pole vaulter
  1982   – Robin tom Rink, German singer-songwriter
1983 – Hikaru Utada, American-Japanese singer-songwriter and producer
1984 – Fabio Catacchini, Italian footballer
  1984   – Karun Chandhok, Indian race car driver
  1984   – Jimmy Kébé, Malian footballer
  1984   – Thomas Vanek, Austrian ice hockey player
1985 – Jake Allen, American football player
  1985   – Pascal Behrenbruch, German decathlete
  1985   – Benny Feilhaber, American soccer player
  1985   – Esteban Guerrieri, Argentinian race car driver
  1985   – Rika Ishikawa, Japanese singer and actress
  1985   – Elliott Ward, English footballer
  1985   – Aleksandr Yevgenyevich Nikulin, Russian footballer
1986 – Claudio Marchisio, Italian footballer
  1986   – Oleksandr Miroshnychenko, Ukrainian footballer
  1986   – Moussa Sow, Senegalese footballer
1987 – Edgar Manucharyan, Armenian footballer
1988 – JaVale McGee, American basketball player
  1988   – Tyler Breeze, Canadian wrestler
1990 – Tatiana Búa, Argentine tennis player
1991 – Petra Martić, Croatian tennis player
1991 – Erin Sanders, American actress
1992 – Shawn Johnson, American gymnast
  1992   – Logan Lerman, American actor
  1992   – Mac Miller, American rapper (d. 2018)
1993 – Erick Torres Padilla, Mexican footballer
1994 – Matthias Ginter, German footballer
  1994   – Alfie Mawson, English footballer
1999 – Jonathan Taylor, American football player

Deaths

Pre-1600
 520 – John of Cappadocia, patriarch of Constantinople
 639 – Dagobert I, Frankish king (b. 603)
 914 – García I, king of León
1003 – Kilian of Cologne, Irish abbot
1302 – Al-Hakim I, caliph of Cairo
1401 – Robert Bealknap, British justice 
1526 – Isabella of Austria, Danish queen (b. 1501)
1547 – Henry Howard, Earl of Surrey, English poet (b. 1516)
1565 – Diego Laynez, Spanish Jesuit theologian (b. 1512)
1571 – Paris Bordone, Venetian painter (b. 1495)
1576 – Hans Sachs, German poet and playwright (b. 1494)
1597 – Maharana Pratap, Hindu Rajput king of Mewar (b.1540)

1601–1900
1636 – Marcus Gheeraerts the Younger, Flemish painter (b.1561)
1661 – Thomas Venner, English rebel leader
1729 – William Congreve, English playwright and poet (b. 1670)
1755 – Jean-Pierre Christin, French physicist, mathematician, and astronomer (b. 1683)
1757 – Thomas Ruddiman, Scottish scholar and academic (b. 1674)
1766 – Giovanni Niccolò Servandoni, Italian-French architect and painter (b. 1695)
1785 – Jonathan Toup, English scholar and critic (b. 1713)
1833 – Ferdinand Hérold, French pianist and composer (b. 1791)
1847 – Charles Bent, American soldier and politician, first Governor of New Mexico (b. 1799)
  1847   – Athanasios Christopoulos, Greek poet (b. 1772)
1851 – Esteban Echeverría, Argentinian poet and author (b. 1805)
1853 – Karl Faber, German historian and academic (b. 1773)
1865 – Pierre-Joseph Proudhon, French philosopher and politician (b. 1809)
1869 – Carl Reichenbach, German chemist and philosopher (b. 1788)
1874 – August Heinrich Hoffmann von Fallersleben, German poet and scholar (b. 1798)
1878 – Henri Victor Regnault, French physicist and chemist (b. 1810)
1895 – António Luís de Seabra, 1st Viscount of Seabra, Portuguese magistrate and politician (b. 1798)

1901–present
1906 – Bartolomé Mitre, Argentinian historian and politician, sixth President of Argentina (b. 1821)
1929 – Liang Qichao, Chinese journalist, philosopher, and scholar (b. 1873)
1930 – Frank P. Ramsey, British mathematician, philosopher and economist (b. 1903)
1938 – Branislav Nušić, Serbian author, playwright, and journalist (b. 1864)
1945 – Gustave Mesny, French general (b. 1886)
1948 – Tony Garnier, French architect and urban planner, designed the Stade de Gerland (b. 1869)
1954 – Theodor Kaluza, German mathematician and physicist (b. 1885)
1957 – József Dudás, Romanian-Hungarian activist and politician (b. 1912)
1963 – Clement Smoot, American golfer (b. 1884)
1964 – Firmin Lambot, Belgian cyclist (b. 1886)
1965 – Arnold Luhaäär, Estonian weightlifter (b. 1905)
1968 – Ray Harroun, American race car driver and engineer (b. 1879)
1972 – Michael Rabin, American violinist (b. 1936)
1973 – Max Adrian, Irish-English actor (b. 1903)
1975 – Thomas Hart Benton, American painter and educator (b. 1889)
1976 – Hidetsugu Yagi, Japanese engineer and academic (b. 1886)
1979 – Moritz Jahn, German novelist and poet (b. 1884)
1980 – William O. Douglas, American lawyer and jurist (b. 1898)
1981 – Francesca Woodman, American photographer (b. 1958)
1982 – Elis Regina, Brazilian soprano (b. 1945)
1984 – Max Bentley, Canadian ice hockey player and coach (b. 1920)
1987 – Lawrence Kohlberg, American psychologist and academic (b. 1927)
1990 – Bhagwan Shree Rajneesh, Indian guru and mystic (b. 1931)
  1990   – Alberto Semprini, English pianist, composer, and conductor (b. 1908)
  1990   – Herbert Wehner, German politician, sixth Minister of Intra-German Relations (b. 1906)
1991 – Marcel Chaput, Canadian biochemist and journalist (b. 1918)
1995 – Gene MacLellan, Canadian singer-songwriter (b. 1938)
1996 – Don Simpson, American actor, producer, and screenwriter (b. 1943)
  1997   – James Dickey, American poet and novelist (b. 1923)
1998 – Carl Perkins, American singer-songwriter and guitarist (b. 1932)
1999 – Ivan Francescato, Italian rugby player (b. 1967)
2000 – Amatu'l-Bahá Rúhíyyih Khánum, a Baháʼí Faith Hand of the Cause of God and wife of Shoghi Effendi (b. 1910)
  2000   – Bettino Craxi, Italian lawyer and politician, 45th Prime Minister of Italy (b. 1934)
  2000   – Hedy Lamarr, Austrian-American actress, singer, and mathematician (b. 1914)
2002 – Vavá, Brazilian footballer and manager (b. 1934)
2003 – Milton Flores, Honduran footballer (b. 1974)
  2003   – Françoise Giroud, French journalist, screenwriter, and politician, French Minister of Culture (b. 1916)
2004 – Harry E. Claiborne, American lawyer and judge (b. 1917)
  2004   – David Hookes, Australian cricketer and coach (b. 1955)
2005 – K. Sello Duiker, South African author and screenwriter (b. 1974)
2006 – Anthony Franciosa, American actor (b. 1928)
  2006   – Wilson Pickett, American singer-songwriter (b. 1941)
2007 – Hrant Dink, Turkish-Armenian journalist and activist (b. 1954)
  2007   – Denny Doherty, Canadian singer-songwriter (b. 1940)
  2007   – Murat Nasyrov, Russian singer-songwriter (b. 1969)
2008 – Suzanne Pleshette, American actress (b. 1937)
  2008   – John Stewart, American singer-songwriter and guitarist (b. 1939)
  2008   – Don Wittman, Canadian sportscaster (b. 1936)
2010 – Bill McLaren, Scottish rugby player and sportscaster (b. 1923)
2012 – Peter Åslin, Swedish ice hockey player (b. 1962)
  2012   – Sarah Burke, Canadian skier (b. 1982)
  2012   – Winston Riley, Jamaican singer-songwriter and producer (b. 1943)
  2012   – Rudi van Dantzig, Dutch ballet dancer and choreographer (b. 1933)
2013 – Taihō Kōki, Japanese sumo wrestler, the 48th Yokozuna (b. 1940)
  2013   – Stan Musial, American baseball player and manager (b. 1920)
  2013   – Frank Pooler, American conductor and composer (b. 1926)
  2013   – Earl Weaver, American baseball player and manager (b. 1930)
  2013   – Toktamış Ateş, Turkish academician, political commentator, columnist and writer (b. 1944)
2014 – Azaria Alon, Ukrainian-Israeli environmentalist, co-founded the Society for the Protection of Nature in Israel (b. 1918)
  2014   – Christopher Chataway, English runner, journalist, and politician (b. 1931)
2015 – Justin Capră, Romanian engineer and academic (b. 1933)
  2015   – Michel Guimond, Canadian lawyer and politician (b. 1953)
  2015   – Ward Swingle, American-French singer-songwriter and conductor (b. 1927)
2016 – Richard Levins, American ecologist and geneticist (b. 1930)
  2016   – Ettore Scola, Italian director and screenwriter (b. 1931)
  2016   – Sheila Sim (Lady Attenborough), English actress (b. 1922)
2017 – Miguel Ferrer, American actor (b. 1955)

Holidays and observances
Christian feast day:
Bassianus of Lodi
Henry of Uppsala
Marius, Martha, Audifax, and Abachum
Mark of Ephesus (Eastern Orthodox Church)
Pontianus of Spoleto
Wulfstan, Bishop of Worcester
January 19 (Eastern Orthodox liturgics)
Confederate Heroes Day (Texas), and its related observance:
Robert E. Lee Day (Alabama, Arkansas, Florida, Georgia and Mississippi)
Husband's Day (Iceland)
Kokborok Day (Tripura, India)
Theophany / Epiphany (Eastern and Oriental Orthodoxy), and its related observances:
Timkat, or 20 during Leap Year (Ethiopian Orthodox)
Vodici or Baptism of Jesus (North Macedonia)

References

External links

 BBC: On This Day
 
 Historical Events on January 19

Days of the year
January